The 1983 USC Trojans football team represented the University of Southern California (USC) in the 1983 NCAA Division I-A football season. In their first year under head coach Ted Tollner, the Trojans compiled a 4–6–1 record (5–2 against conference opponents), finished in fourth place in the Pacific-10 Conference (Pac-10), and were outscored by their opponents by a combined total of 238 to 210.

Quarterback Sean Salisbury led the team in passing, completing 142 of 248 passes for 1,882 yards with ten touchdowns and nine interceptions.  Michael Harper led the team in rushing with 151 carries for 685 yards and six touchdowns. Timmie Ware led the team in receiving yards with 23 catches for 481 yards and five touchdowns.

Schedule

Game summaries

Florida

Oregon State

Kansas

South Carolina

Washington State

Arizona State

Notre Dame

California

    
    
    
    
    
    
    
    

USC sacked Pac-10 total offense leader Gale Gilbert eight times.

Stanford

Washington

UCLA

References

USC
USC Trojans football seasons
USC Trojans football